Federico Agliardi (born 11 February 1983) is an Italian footballer who currently plays as goalkeeper for Eccellenza Lombardy side Lumezzane.

Career

Brescia
Agliardi grew up in his native city's team, Brescia Calcio, and made his professional debut with Cosenza of Serie B on 2002–03. He debuted in Serie A on 8 November 2003 with Brescia in a league match against Bologna.

Palermo
Agliardi signed for Palermo in January 2006, in a swap deal with Nicola Santoni (50% registration rights), and quickly became a first team regular. In the deal Agliardi was valued €4 million and half of Santoni's rights was valued €1 million He also played for the Italy U-21 national team.

On 17 September 2006, Agliardi and teammate David Di Michele combined to lift the Rosanero to a 2–1 victory over Lazio in Rome. In the latter stages of the first half, Agliardi denied efforts from Cristian Ledesma, Stefano Mauri (twice), Christian Manfredini, Goran Pandev (a rebound attempt from Manfredini's shot, Agliardi deflected the ball past his left-hand post with his foot), and Massimo Oddo. Earlier, Di Michele's 10th- and 38th-minute goals had put Palermo ahead. Lazio did get a consolation goal through Tommaso Rocchi in the 73rd minute. The result elevated Palermo to second place in Serie A, behind Lazio's city rivals and stadium-mates Roma on goal difference, with a 100% record. This performance was followed by a number of less notable ones, including a criticised appearance in a 5–3 Palermo win in a Sicilian derby to Catania, and Agliardi ultimately became a back-up player at Palermo, behind veteran goalkeeper Alberto Fontana, who served as main goalkeeper also in the following 2007–08 season.

Following the acquisition of Italian international Marco Amelia from Livorno, Agliardi's hopes of playing as a regular became even slimmer. Consequently, in July 2008 Palermo finalized a loan move to Serie B side Rimini for the Brescia-born goalkeeper.

Padova
On 17 July 2009 he was sold to Serie B side Padova on free transfer. Palermo choose to release the player from his contract one year earlier.

Bologna
On 14 July 2011, Agliardi joined Serie A side Bologna along with José Ángel Crespo and Daniele Vantaggiato. The club had lost Emiliano Viviano as first choice before the start of season. However Agliardi failed to challenge Jean-François Gillet for the starting place, which the Belgian internationals played most of the game. After Gillet left the team for Torino in July 2012, he became Bologna's first-choice goalkeeper, making 22 appearances during the 2012–13 season. However, he returned to his backup role behind on loan goalkeeper Gianluca Curci since the beginning of the second half. Having made no appearances until the first part of the following season, Agliardi signed a loan deal with Serie B side Cesena on 31 January 2014.

Cesena
On 30 June 2014 Agliardi joined Cesena in definitive deal after a successful loan, with Luca Ceccarelli moved to opposite direction. Agliardi signed a 3-year contract.

Lower divisions
On 4 September 2020 he signed with fifth-tier club Lumezzane.

References

External links
Agliardi's profile (from US Palermo official website)

1983 births
Living people
Footballers from Brescia
Italian footballers
Association football goalkeepers
Brescia Calcio players
Cosenza Calcio 1914 players
Palermo F.C. players
Rimini F.C. 1912 players
Calcio Padova players
Bologna F.C. 1909 players
A.C. Cesena players
F.C. Lumezzane V.G.Z. A.S.D. players
Serie A players
Serie B players
Serie C players
Serie D players
Italy under-21 international footballers
Italy youth international footballers